Frac or FRAC may refer to:

 Frac or fraccing, short name for Hydraulic fracturing, a method for extracting oil and natural gas
 FRAC Act, United States legislation proposed in 2009 to regulate hydraulic fracturing
 Frac module, a format for the MOTM modular synthesizer
 Frac pacs, packaged ground coffee for coffee machines
 Frac Press, an imprint of OmniScriptum devoted to the reproduction of Wikipedia content
 Frac(R), mathematical notation for field of fractions, the smallest field in which an integral domain can be embedded

 Fonds régional d'art contemporain (FRAC), a network of 23 public collections of contemporary art across France
 Fleet Replacement Aircrew Training, an advanced training option for aircrewmen in the U.S. Navy
 Formula Regional Americas Championship, regional Formula 3 championship
 Formula Regional Asian Championship, regional Formula 3 championship
 Front for the Alternance and Change, a party coalition formed during the Togolese presidential election, 2010
 Fungicide Resistance Action Committee, an organization for fungicide management

See also

 Frack (disambiguation)
 Frak (disambiguation)
 Frakk, a fictional Hungarian cartoon character
 FRACS, Fellow of the Royal Australasian College of Surgeons, in Australia and New Zealand
 Phrack, an ezine for hackers